Fischler is a German Jewish surname. Notable people with the surname include:

 Abraham S. Fischler
 Claude Fischler
 Franz Fischler
 Georg Fischler
 Patrick Fischler
 Stan Fischler
 Willy Fischler

See also
 Fischler–Susskind mechanism

German-language surnames